Simon & Schuster v. Crime Victims Board, 502 U.S. 105 (1991), was a Supreme Court case dealing with Son of Sam laws, which are state laws that prevent convicted criminals from publishing books about their crime for profit. Simon & Schuster challenged the law's application to profits from Nicholas Pileggi's book Wiseguy: Life in a Mafia Family, which was written with paid assistance from former mobster Henry Hill. The court struck down the Son of Sam law in New York on the ground that the law was violative of the First Amendment, which protects free speech. Nevertheless, similar laws in other states remain unchallenged.  The opinion of the court was written by Sandra Day O'Connor.

In the wake of this case, New York modified its law to apply to any economic benefits derived from criminal activities, not just proceeds from publications.

References

External links
 

United States Supreme Court cases
United States Supreme Court cases of the Rehnquist Court
United States Free Speech Clause case law
1991 in United States case law